Cristiano Morgado (born 27 August 1979, in Johannesburg) is a South African racing driver of Portuguese descent. A five-time Rotax Max Challenge World Champion, he is the first and only driver to ever hold five Rotax world titles. He won his first Rotax Max Challenge World Championship in 2004 and followed this up with the European Championship the following year in the RM1 class. He was also on pole position for the 2004 Formula Ford Festival in his first year of car racing. In 2006 he achieved 4 wins on his way to the runner up spot in the British Formula Three National Class Championship. These achievements led him to receive the honor of Protea Colours. In 2008 he entered the new Formula Volkswagen Series launched in South Africa scoring 8 wins during the championship season. These results earned him his first A1 Grand Prix berth for A1 Team South Africa as the test driver in Taupo, New Zealand. Following a good performance he was also selected for the final two races of the season in Portimão, Portugal and Brands Hatch, England. In a return to karting for the 2011 season, he won the Rotax World Championship in the DD2 Masters class. He repeated this feat in 2012, 2013 and again in 2018, in so doing clinching his record fifth title.

External links
Official Website

Living people
1979 births
South African racing drivers
British Formula Three Championship drivers
A1 Grand Prix Rookie drivers
World Series Formula V8 3.5 drivers
Fluid Motorsport Development drivers
Comtec Racing drivers